The 2007–08 season was the 106th season of competitive football in Italy.

Overview 
 Juventus will make their return to Serie A after being relegated to Serie B for the previous season for their role in the 2006 Serie A scandal.
 Grosseto will make their debut in Serie B, the highest division in which the club has participated in its history.

Events 
 June 28, 2007 - The FIGC announce that the Serie A season will begin on August 26, 2007 and end on May 18, 2008.
 August 19, 2007 - In the Italian Super Cup, Roma defeat Inter 1-0.
 August 25, 2007 - Serie B season begins.
 August 26, 2007 - Serie A season begins.
 November 17, 2007 - Italy book their place in Euro 2008 with a win over Scotland.
 December 2, 2007 - Italy drawn into Group C for Euro 2008 along with Holland, Romania, and France
 May 18, 2008 - Inter successfully defends their title in Serie A.
 June 15, 2008 - Lecce joins Bologna and Chievo as the teams promoted to Serie A.
 June 17, 2008 - Italy finishes second in Group C in Euro 2008 and qualifies for the quarter-finals
 June 22, 2008 - Italy is eliminated from Euro 2008 by Spain.
 June 26, 2008 - Roberto Donadoni is fired as head coach; Marcello Lippi returns to the position.

Managerial changes

National team 

Italy will continue their qualifying campaign for Euro 2008. They are coached by Roberto Donadoni.

Key
 H = Home match
 A = Away match
 N = Neutral site
 ECQ = European Championship Qualifier
 F = friendly
 EC (C) = European Championship - Group C match
 EC (Q) = European Championship - Quarter-final match

Honours

Transfer deals 
 List of Italian football transfers 2007-08

Deaths 
 Erminio Favalli, 64, Juventus and Palermo midfielder.
 Adriano Lombardi, 62, Avellino defender and then manager. Killed by amyotrophic lateral sclerosis.

References 

 
Seasons in Italian football
2007 in Italian sport
2007 in association football
2008 in Italian sport
2008 in association football